Compas is the ninth studio album by rumba band Gipsy Kings. It was released in 1997 in Europe and the US, using a different song order. The European version has one completely new track, "Sueño de Noche", as well as a remixed version of "Ami Wa Wa (Solo Por Ti)".

Track listing

Credits
Arranged By – Gipsy Kings, Jon Carin
Mastered By – Bob Ludwig
Mixed By, Producer – Chris Kimsey
Photography – Peter Knaup

Personnel 
(using the American track list)
Abud Abdel Al - violin (1, 2, 4, 5)
Paco Baliardo - compas (flamenco) guitar (4, 8)
Tonino Baliardo - solo guitar (3, 4, 5, 7, 8, 9, 11, 12, 13), compas (flamenco) guitar (4, 8, 11)
Gipsy Kings, unspecified - guitar (3, 5, 6, 7, 9)
Jon Carin - piano accordion (1, 2, 7), Kurzweil (1, 7, 10), strings (2, 5, 13), bass guitar (3), sample claps (3), tambourine (3), castanets (3), djembe harp (4), loops (4, 5), atmosphere (5), Egyptian flute (5), keyboards (6), percussion (7, 9, 10), cymbal (8), finger snaps (8), steel guido (8), electric guitar (9), piano (9, 11), autoharp (10), acoustic guitar (10), drum programming (11), programmed percussion (12)
Shawn Farrenden - didgeridoo (1)
Manu Katché - drums (8, 11)
Andres Levin—additional keyboards (7), samples (7)
Pino Palladino, bass (1, 7), bass guitar (2, 4, 5, 10, 11, 12), electric guitar (9), acoustic guitar (10)
Hossam Ramzy - Egyptian percussion (1, 3, 4, 5, 7, 9, 10, 12), shaker (8)
Andre Reyes – lead vocals (1, 7), backing vocals (1), harmony vocals (2, 3, 5, 6, 7, 10, 12), hand clapping (2, 4, 12), guitar (10, 12)
François "Canut" Reyes - backing vocals (1), lead vocals (2, 13), guitar (2, 13)
Georges "Baule" Reyes - backing vocals (1), guitar (12)
Nicholas Reyes – lead vocals (1, 3, 5, 6, 10, 12), backing vocals (1), hand clapping (2, 3, 4, 12); percussion (6), guitar (10), harmony vocals (12)
Patchai Reyes - backing vocals (1), hand clapping (3),  lead vocals (9), harmony vocals (9)
Paul Reyes – backing vocals (1)
Eddie Thornton - trumpet (3, 7, 9)
Brian Edwards - saxophone (3, 7, 9, 11)
Trevor Edwards - trombone (3, 7, 9)
Nigel Shaw - flute (5, 13), whistle (6. 13)
Naná Vasconcelos - percussion (7)

Certifications and sales

References

External links
Compas at gipsykings.net

1997 albums
Gipsy Kings albums
Albums produced by Chris Kimsey
Nonesuch Records albums